Benvenida Cohen Belmonte was a British Jewish poet, who lived in London at the beginning of the eighteenth century.

Her mother Manuela Nuñez de Almeida was a poet before her, as was her brother, Mordecai Nuñez de Almeyda. She was among those who sang the praise of  Espejo fiel de vidas (London, 1720). She also wrote a panegyric poem in honour of Captain Samuel Nassy of Suriname.

References
 

Year of death unknown
Year of birth unknown
18th-century English women writers
18th-century English writers
18th-century English poets
Spanish-language poets
English Jewish writers
18th-century Sephardi Jews
English people of Spanish-Jewish descent
Jewish women writers
Writers from London
English Sephardi Jews